Avalanche Ridge is a linear rock ridge,  long, extending north from Pillsbury Tower and separating Basecamp Valley from Austin Valley, in Antarctica's Jones Mountains. It was mapped by the University of Minnesota Jones Mountains Party, 1960–61, and so named by them because of the continual avalanching of snow off the flanks of the ridge.

References
 

Ridges of Ellsworth Land